KMXE-FM is a commercial radio station in Red Lodge, Montana, broadcasting on 99.3 FM. It is owned by Silver Rock Communications in Red Lodge, and airs an adult hits music format, branded as “The Mountain”.

The studios are at 9 South Broadway, Red Lodge. The transmitter and its  tower are off Ski Run Road, west of Red Lodge. The tower, the 4th highest in the state of Montana, reaches 11 counties in Montana and Wyoming.

External links
KMXE-FM website

References

MXE-FM
Radio stations established in 1994
1994 establishments in Montana